Ellen Harding Baker, née Sarah Ellen Harding (June 8, 1847March 30, 1886) was an American astronomer and a teacher. She is known for her Solar System Quilt, used as a teaching aid in her lectures on astronomy.

Biography
Sarah Ellen Harding was the daughter of Stephen and Ann (Terry) Harding.

She married Marion Baker (10 October 1867) and the couple lived in Cedar County, Iowa. Ellen Harding taught and lectured astronomy in West Branch, Moscow, and Lone Tree, Iowa.

In 1878, the family moved to Johnson County where Baker had a general merchandise business in Lone Tree. 
They had seven children together before her death of tuberculosis.

Solar System Quilt

In 1876, Ellen Harding created the Solar System Quilt to assist her during astronomy lectures.

She may be the woman from local newspapers in the winter of 1883–1884, which mentioned that it took seven years for an Iowa woman to embroid the Solar System on a quilt.

The quilt has a wool top embellished with wool-fabric applique, wool braid, and wool and silk embroidery. The quilt bears a striking design which resembles illustrations in astronomy books of her period. The quilt shows the Sun at the center and the eight planets of the Solar System (with indicated orbits around the Sun), as well as the asteroid belt. The myriad of stars that exist beyond the Solar System are also shown. The Galilean moons of Jupiter, as well as moons of Earth, Saturn, Neptune and Uranus are included, as are Saturn's rings. A comet with an eccentric orbit is also present - perhaps Halley's comet which had last been seen in 1835.

The quilt is large; it measures 89 x 106 inches (225 cm x 269 cm).

The quilt is currently in possession at the Smithsonian Institution, National Museum of American History, donated by Patricia Hill McCloy and Kathryn Hill Meardon. It has not been on view since 2018.

In the 2021 lyrical picture book She Stitched The Stars: A Story Of Ellen Harding Baker's Solar System Quilt author Jennifer Harris imagines the origins of the quilt.

References

People from Cincinnati
People from Iowa
1847 births
1886 deaths
American women astronomers
19th-century American astronomers
Space artists
19th-century deaths from tuberculosis
Tuberculosis deaths in Iowa
Quilters